Leucopogon plumuliflorus is a shrub  in the family Ericaceae. It is endemic to Western Australia.

Description
Leucopogon plumuliflorus is a slender, multi-stemmed shrub which grows to heights of from 0.1 m to 0.4 m. It flowers in April or from July to November, and the flowers are white or white-pink.

Distribution and habitat
It is found in the IBRA region of Geraldton Sandplains, on lateritic sandy soils, amongst boulders and on hillslopes.

Taxonomy
It was first described in 1867 by Ferdinand von Mueller as Styphelia plumuliflora, but in 1868 he reassigned it to the genus Leucopogon.

References

plumuliflorus
Ericales of Australia
Plants described in 1867
Taxa named by Ferdinand von Mueller
Eudicots of Western Australia